Milagro y magia (English title: Miracle and magic) is a Mexican telenovela produced by Roberto Gómez Bolaños and Florinda Meza for Televisa in 1991. It starred by Florinda Meza, Miguel Palmer, Ofelia Guilmáin, Tony Carbajal, Carlos Bracho and Rafael Sánchez Navarro.

Plot
After the Mexican Revolution, two orphans, Elisa and Pepe, leave the province for the capital. They are trying to survive. During the trip they meet an older child, Adrian, who takes them to his home. Here lives Macaria, an old witch that gathers and exploits children, send them to steal.

After some years, Adrian tries to violate Elisa and Pepe to save it hurts Adrian, then the two beyond Mexico City. Then they have to be separated. Wandering the streets, Elisa finds Roberto, an acrobat, and his dog. He helps you. With them: Don Roque and Dona Rufina, two janitors who treat Elisa as a daughter.

Roberto and Elisa loved, but he is afraid because he is 20 years older than her. In its tour are Pepe and go to work in a small circus. By mistake, Roberto believed to be the father of Elisa, then lost sight of each other, but Elisa will look to him for many years.

Then she meets Carlos Andrade a theater critic who falls for her. It offered to work in radio and television. Elisa becomes a movie star and meets a magnate: George Higgins, separated from his wife. She moves in with him and becomes pregnant.

During a trip to New York, George dies in a plane crash and Elisa remains the sole heir, shortly after giving birth to a girl named Fabiola. Elisa refuses to marry Carlos because he thinks Roberto.

But later, Elisa marries Arturo a swindler. This marriage is a failure. Elisa finally succeeds in finding Roberto, but he is dying in a hospital. Fabiola is now fiancée of Hector, who is the son of Roberto and Elisa the past returns ...

Cast 
 
 Florinda Meza as Elisa Carmichael
 Miguel Palmer as Roberto
 Ofelia Guilmáin as Rufina
 Tony Carbajal as Roque
 Carlos Bracho as George O'Higgins
 Rafael Sánchez Navarro as Carlos Andrade
 Juan Antonio Edwards as Pepe
 Paulina Gómez Fernández as Fabiola
 Xavier Ximénez as Hector
 Lucía Guilmáin as Macaria
 Miguel Pizarro as Adrián "El Coyote"
 Miguel Angel Infante as Álvaro
 Alberto Angel "El Cuervo" as Raúl
 Lizzeta Romo as Salomé
 Lili Inclán as Jimena
 Eugenia Avendaño as Jacinta
 Inés Morales as Cristina
 Roberto Cañedo as Serafín
 Laura Luz as Sofía
 Moisés Suárez as Valerio
 Héctor Yaber as Arturo
 Leticia Montaño as Marina
 Carlos Feria as Francisco
 Raquel Morell as Yolanda
 Lorena Patricia as Margot Escalante
 Roberto Columba as Police
 Lucy Reina as Lucía
 Pablo Aura as Polilla
 Christian Gascón as Polilla (child)
 Karla Talavera as Elisa (child)
 Micheline Kinery as Gabriela
 Nahamin Pérez Fana as Elisa María
 Paola Rojas as Fabiola (child)

Awards and nominations

References

External links

1991 telenovelas
Mexican telenovelas
1991 Mexican television series debuts
1991 Mexican television series endings
Spanish-language telenovelas
Television shows set in Mexico City
Televisa telenovelas